The Port City Sharks is a member of the professional minor-league Continental Basketball League based in Savannah, Georgia which began play in 2011. Home games are played at the campus of Savannah High School.

References

External links
 Official Website

Basketball teams in Georgia (U.S. state)
Basketball teams in Savannah, Georgia
Continental Basketball League teams
Basketball teams established in 2011
2011 establishments in Georgia (U.S. state)